Edward Chambers (born March 29, 1982) is an American former professional boxer. He challenged once for a unified world heavyweight title in 2010. He was ranked as the fourth best heavyweight in the world by The Ring at the conclusion of 2009. A defensively-oriented fighter, Chambers has been widely credited for his counterpunching skills and particularly praised for his hand speed and footwork. He has also been one of the first heavyweights with ability to switch between fighting orthodox and southpaw.

Amateur career
As an amateur, Chambers was trained by his father Eddie Chambers, Sr. In total, Chambers won over 80 bouts, winning the 1999 amateur Pennsylvania state heavyweight title.

Professional career
Eddie made his professional boxing debut in 2000 at the age of 18, defeating Tyrone Austin by second-round TKO. In the span of five years, Chambers won 22 fights in a row before facing his first notable opponent, Ross Puritty, who had faced another prospect Alexander Dimitrenko six months prior in a losing effort. Chambers won the fight by unanimous decision (UD), with scores 99–91, 98–92 and 99–91. He then defeated local rival Robert Hawkins, winning the Pennsylvania heavyweight title. In 2006, Chambers faced another notable fighter, former WBO world heavyweight title challenger Ed Mahone. Coming into the fight, Mahone had 23–6–2 record, with all of his wins coming inside the distance. Chambers won the fight by fourth-round TKO.

With a perfect 27–0 record, Chambers faced another undefeated fighter, 15–0 Derric Rossy, for the USBA heavyweight title. Chambers dominated Rossy throughout the fight, ultimately giving him his first career loss after the referee stopped the fight in round 7, preventing battered and bruised Rossy from continuing absorbing punishment. Rossy eventually suffered his second loss at the hands of Alexander Dimitrenko by fifth-round TKO. Meahwhile, Chambers faced his toughest challenge to date in Dominick Guinn just three months later. Guinn, once described as "hot prospect" and viewed as one of the top-rising American heavyweight contenders, was 3–2–1 in his last six fights, losing to James Toney and Tony Thompson by unanimous decisions but defeating then-highly regarded prospest, Olympic Gold medalist Audley Harrison. Guinn was also known for his durability, having never been stopped in his entire career. Chambers defeated Guinn by a lopsided unanimous decision.

The win over Dominick Guinn earned Chambers a spot in the 4-man elimination tournament to face Wladimir Klitschko for the IBF world heavyweight championship. In semifinals, Chambers faced Calvin Brock, who had challenged Klitschko for the IBF title a year prior. Brock, who had beaten a handful of heavyweight contenders and prospects throughout his career, such as Jameel McCline, Timur Ibragimov and Clifford Etienne, claimed to be in the best shape of his career. Brock weighed in at 241 lbs, the heaviest in his entire career and almost 17 lbs heavier than in his bout against Klitschko. The additional weight appeared to be muscle.

The fight took place at Emerald Queen Casino in Tacoma, Washington and was aired live on Showtime. Chambers appeared to have the upper hand in the fight, effectively using his hand speed and upper-body movement, and was declared the winner by split decision, with two judges scoring the bout 115–113 in favor of Chambers, while the third judge had the same score but in favor of Brock. Chambers damaged Brock's right eye during the bout, which, after subsequent botched surgery, prompted Brock to retire from the sport.

In the final, which took place less than three months later, Chambers faced undefeated Alexander Povetkin, who had beaten former IBF world champion Chris Byrd in semifinals by eleventh-round TKO. The bout took place in Berlin, Germany. Chambers was doing the better work in early rounds, landing cleaner, harder shots, but was eventually overwhelmed by Povetkin's relentless pressure. Ultimately the bout went the distance, with Povetkin being declared the winner by unanimous decision. The scores were 117–111, 116–112 and 119–109.

After his fight with Povetkin he won three more bouts, including one against Raphael Butler, before facing Samuel Peter on March 27, 2009. Peter, ranked No.6 heavyweight in the world by The Ring, was 5-1 in the last six bouts, having had scored wins over James Toney (twice) and former heavyweight contender Jameel McCline before beating Oleg Maskaev by sixth-round TKO to become WBC world heavyweight champion. Prior to facing Chambers, however, Peter had lost the world championship to Vitali Klitschko, and was looking to bounce back to the heavyweight title picture. The fight took place at Nokia Theatre in Los Angeles, and was aired on ESPN2. Chambers injured his right thumb early in the third round, but was able to outbox Peter for the majority of the fight, frustrating his opponent with speed and quickness and blocking most of Peter's shots using his gloves and arms. As a result, Chambers was declared the winner by majority decision, with judges scoring the bout 99–91, 96–94 and 95–95. Some observers criticized the 95–95 score, believing Peter had not done enough to win more than three rounds.

A win over Peter lined Chambers up to fight 6 ft 7in tall, undefeated Alexander Dimitrenko on July 4, 2009 in a WBO world heavyweight title eliminator. Coming into the bout, Dimitrenko had scored five stoppages in a row, with his most recent win against popular German boxer Luan Krasniqi. At the time of the fight, Chambers was ranked No.6 heavyweight contender by The Ring, while Dimitrenko was ranked No.8 by the same publication. Dimitrenko was also ranked within top 5 by all major sanctioning bodies. Chambers weighed in at 208 1/4 lbs, the lightest since 2003. Chambers was outweighed by Dimitrenko by 45 1/2 lbs.

The fight took place at Color Line Arena in Hamburg, Germany. It was Chambers' second fight in Germany. The event was televised by ZDF. Unlike his previous fights, Chambers was the aggressor, taking the centre of the ring and constantly pressing Dimitrenko against the ropes. After putting pressure and slowing down Dimitrenko's left arm in the early rounds, Chambers established his rhythm by the fifth, successfully finding his way inside Dimitrenko's jab. Dimitrenko received a standing count in the seventh round after a left hook to the body, and was knocked down in the tenth after another left hook, this time to the chin. Chambers won the fight by majority decision. The judges scored the bout 117–109, 116–111 and 113–113, with some experts criticizing the 113–113 score.

Chambers vs. Klitschko
The win made Chambers the mandatory challenger for the WBO world heavyweight title held by Wladimir Klitschko. In the build-up to the fight, Klitschko described Chambers as "the best American heavyweight right now". Coming into the bout, Chambers was ranked No.3 heavyweight contender by The Ring, whereas Wladimir was the magazine's champion. In the pre-fight comparison of the fighters, The Ring gave Chambers the upper hand in speed and athletic ability, as well as defense, while crediting Klitschko as more powerful and experienced. The fight generated little interest in the United States, where it was not televised by any TV station but was aired on the Klitschko's official website instead. The official venue was the multi-functional football stadium ESPRIT Arena in Dusseldorf, Germany.

The bout turned-out to be one-sided, with the champion winning rounds keeping Chambers at the end of his jab and occasionally throwing straight right hands. In the opening rounds, Chambers lifted Klitschko and took him down several times but was not deducted a point nor warned. In between the championship rounds, Klitschko was criticized by his trainer Emmanuel Steward for not fighting aggressively, despite comfortably winning on the scorecards. Klitschko picked up his pace during the final round and, with few seconds left, landed a left hook on Chambers' temple. Chambers fell partially through the ropes and was reportedly unconscious for a few minutes after the bout ended.

Post-Klitschko fights; injuries and inactivity
Chambers returned to the ring almost eleven months later, defeating Derric Rossy again, this time by unanimous decision, in an IBF title eliminator. He was scheduled to face Tony Thompson on 28 October 2011 in a bout televised by Showtime, but had to pull out due to spinal injury. Chambers claimed to have problems with his back for an extended period of time, and that it finally caught up to him during preparation for the Thompson fight. He was then due to face former WBO world heavyweight champion Siarhei Liakhovich on 21 January 2012 at Asylum Arena in Philadelphia, in the inaugural main event of the Fight Night card televised by NBC Sports, but was forced to withdraw after fracturing his ribs during training camp.

Chambers returned to the ring sixteen months later, against former WBC light-heavyweight and IBF and The Ring cruiserweight champion Tomasz Adamek for the vacant IBF North American heavyweight title. Both Adamek and Chambers were praised for taking the fight with no world title nor mandatory position on the line, with Adamek trying to re-establish himself after the tenth-round TKO loss to Vitali Klitschko. Coming into the fight, Adamek was ranked No.3 heavyweight contender by The Ring, while Chambers, who had had only one fight in the last two years and three months, was unranked by the publication. The fight was the main event of the Fight Night card on NBC Sports. In the opening rounds, both fighters were trading shots, with Chambers landing the most meaningful punches. During the first round, Chambers torn his bicep in the left arm, and often switched between orthodox and southpaw stances throughout the rest of the fight, throwing shots almost exclusively with the right hand, mostly connecting with overhand punches. Adamek was more active since round 3, frequently switching up from counterpuncher to aggressor. The bout lasted full twelve rounds, with Adamek being declared the winner by unanimous decision with scores 116–112 (twice) and 119–109. Most observers thought that the bout was close, with many of them criticizing the 119–109 score. According to CompuBox, 1,381 punches were thrown, with Chambers landing 152 punches out of 462 thrown (32.9% accuracy), while Adamek landed 134 punches out of 919 (14.6%). Chambers outlanded Adamek in rounds 1–5, 7, 8, 10 and 11. He also landed more power shots in nine of the twelve rounds.

In late 2012, Tyson Fury was in talks with promoter Kathy Duva to fight Chambers in a step-up fight, however talks stalled due to the injury sustained in the Adamek fight. 

Chambers made his return to the ring fourteen months later, moving down to cruiserweight to fight South African contender Thabiso Mchunu. Having had fought only twice in three and a half years prior to the bout, Chambers gave a relatively poor showing and lost the fight by unanimous decision.
Enamored with his unique skill set, from 2013 to 2015, Chambers was signed by Team Fury and based in the United Kingdom trained by Peter Fury, who was then-trainer of unified heavyweight champion Tyson Fury, and heavyweight contender Hughie Fury. Chambers is credited with helping teach Tyson Fury his defensive style of "slick American boxing". Chambers then signed with manager Al Haymon and made his U.S. return in late 2015, defeating journeyman Galen Brown by third-round TKO. He then faced Gerald Washington on Premier Boxing Champions on Fox, losing the bout by a lopsided unanimous decision. Following the loss, Chambers subsequently retired from the sport.

Comeback out of retirement
On February 7, 2023, at age 40, Chambers made his return to the ring after a near 7 year lay-off with a 3rd-round TKO victory against Corey Williams. Chambers weighed in as a heavyweight at 226 ¾ lbs. Per trainers James Ali Bashir and Steve Upsher, Chambers will look to compete at heavyweight but keep close attention to a newer WBC weight class of bridgerweight, which falls between 200 and 224-pounds.

Other media
Chambers appeared in the 2006 video game Fight Night Round 4, as well as Fight Night Champion. He also commentated for the UK boxing TV channel BoxNation, and makes occasional appearances as a panelist on the BoxHard Podcast. Eddie also appears frequently on the Coach Anthony YouTube channel and instructional videos.

Professional boxing record

Television viewership

Germany

References

External links

Living people
1982 births
African-American boxers
Heavyweight boxers
American male boxers
Boxers from Pittsburgh
21st-century African-American sportspeople
20th-century African-American people